Behzad Mohammedzadeh (Persian: بهزاد محمدزاده) is an Iranian hacker and cyber-fugitive.

Criminal career 
In 2020, Mohammedzadeh and another hacker named Marwan Abusrour defaced multiple American government websites after the death of Qasem Soleimani, they defaced the website by putting the Iranian flag and text, "Death to America" on the website.  He was indicted in Massachusetts on the charges of Conspiracy to Commit Intentional Damage to a Protected Computer and Intentional Damage to a Protected Computer.

References 

Iranian people
Hackers
Fugitives
Iranian nationalists
Living people
Year of birth missing (living people)